('Norwegian Deaf Museum') is a museum in Trondheim, Norway. The museum is located in Rødbygget, which was drawn by Christian Heinrich Grosch. It was the first Neo-Gothic building in Trondheim, built in 1855.
The museum was established in 1992, and rebuilt in 2009. Today the upper floors hold offices, and a café is located on the first floor.

Background

History
The building was originally a school for the deaf,  ('Trondheim Deaf-Mute Institute') and later  ('Trondheim Public School for the Deaf'), founded by Andreas Christian Møller. It included apartments for both-sex students and the warden, and a prayer room. During World War II it was used as a hospital. In 1991 the school was transferred to Heimdal.

Rødbygget
The Neo-Gothic style was characteristic of Grosch's later works. A common element of these was the brick façade. The highly decorated inner courtyard is rather unusual in Trondheim.

References

External links 
 Museum website

1992 establishments in Norway
Museums established in 1992
Museums in Trondheim
Deafness organizations